Calmodulin regulated spectrin associated protein family member 2 (CAMSAP2) is a protein that in humans is encoded by the CAMSAP2 gene. It acts as a microtubule minus-end anchor, and binds microtubules through its CKK domain.

See also 

 CAMSAP3
 CAMSAP1

References

Further reading 

Human proteins